Bianca Kappler (born 8 August 1977) is a German long jumper.

Biography
Born in Hamburg, she finished ninth at the 2004 Olympic Games. She competed at the World Championships in 2003 and 2005 without reaching the finals.

At the 2005 European Indoor Championships her last jump was measured to 6.96 metres, which would have secured her the gold medal by a comfortable margin. However, Kappler admitted to the referees that she could not possibly have jumped 6.96 m, which would be 30 cm further than her personal best at the time. 
Video analysis confirmed the mismeasurement and the jump was ruled invalid. The silver medal was won in 6.64 m, while Kappler remained with 6.53 m. She was later awarded a bronze medal for fair play.

At the 2007 European Indoor Championships she finished fourth, equalling her indoor personal best of 6.63 metres. Her personal best jump is 6.90 metres, achieved in July 2007 in Bad Langensalza. Her partner is the Austrian decathlete Klaus Ambrosch.

Competition record

References

External links 
 Official website 
 
 EAA profile

1977 births
Living people
Athletes from Hamburg
German female long jumpers
German national athletics champions
Athletes (track and field) at the 2004 Summer Olympics
Olympic athletes of Germany